The Silsbee effect or Silsbee current refers to the effect by which, if the current exceeds a critical level, the superconducting state will be destroyed. The size of the critical current (which can be as large as 100 amp in a 1-mm wire) depends on the nature and geometry of the specimen and is related to whether the magnetic field produced by the current exceeds the critical field at the surface of the superconductor.

References 

Superconductivity